Terrall Brent "T. J." Rushing (born June 8, 1983) is an American football coach and former player who currently serves as defensive backs coach at Texas A&M University. As a player, he played as a cornerback and return specialist. He was drafted by the Indianapolis Colts of the National Football League in the seventh round of the 2006 NFL Draft, and played four seasons with the team. He won a Super Bowl with Indianapolis, when the Colts defeated the Chicago Bears in Super Bowl XLI. He played college football at Stanford.

Early years
Rushing attended Pauls Valley High School in Pauls Valley, Oklahoma and was a letterman in football, basketball, and track.

Stanford career
Rushing finished his Stanford career as one of the top three kick returners in school history with 1409 yards. He was named First Team All Pac-10 for his work on special teams during his junior year. Rushing had three career touchdowns on kickoff returns, including both the first and last return of his senior season.

Professional career

NFL

Indianapolis Colts
Rushing mainly played on special teams as a kick/punt returner for the Colts, in a career which includes one punt return touchdown against the Oakland Raiders in 2007. Rushing spent the entire 2008 season on injured reserve.

He was non-tendered as a restricted free agent following the 2009 NFL season.

Detroit Lions
Rushing signed with the Detroit Lions on August 18, 2010, and was released by the club on September 4, 2010.

Saskatchewan Roughriders
Rushing was signed by the Saskatchewan Roughriders on April 19, 2012. He was released during training camp on June 17, 2012.

Coaching

Arizona State University
Rushing was hired as a defensive backs coach for Arizona State University in 2016.

University of Memphis
Rushing was hired as the defensive backs coach for Memphis in January 2018.

Texas A&M University
Rushing was hired as the defensive backs coach for Texas A&M University in January 2020.

References

External links
Indianapolis Colts bio
Stanford Cardinal bio
Arizona State University bio

1983 births
Living people
People from Pauls Valley, Oklahoma
Players of American football from Oklahoma
African-American players of American football
American football cornerbacks
American football return specialists
Stanford Cardinal football players
Indianapolis Colts players
Detroit Lions players
African-American players of Canadian football
Canadian football return specialists
Saskatchewan Roughriders players
Coaches of American football from Oklahoma
African-American coaches of American football
Arizona State Sun Devils football coaches
Northern Arizona Lumberjacks football coaches
Memphis Tigers football coaches
Florida State Seminoles football coaches
Texas A&M Aggies football coaches
21st-century African-American sportspeople
20th-century African-American people